Gerai is a Greater North Borneo language spoken in Indonesia. It was added to ISO 639-3 in 2020, after splitting it and Beginci from Semandang.

References

External links
Ethnologue entry for Gerai
"Austronesian Languages" from Encyclopædia Britannica

Languages of Indonesia
Land Dayak languages